This is a list of named geological features on Titania.

Chasms

Titanian chasms are called chasmata. They are named after the locations of plays by William Shakespeare.

Scarps

Titanian escarpments are called rupes. They are named after the locations of plays by William Shakespeare.

Craters

Titanian craters are named after female characters in the plays of William Shakespeare.

External links
 USGS: Titania nomenclature

simple:List of geological features on Titania